Bosnian hip hop is a style of music made in Bosnia and Herzegovina.

Although quite a new music style in Bosnia, it has nevertheless proven to be very popular. The hip hop scene has coalesced around several major portals on the internet. The center of hip hop and hip hop culture used to be only Tuzla, primarily thanks to the first radio hip hop show and label called FMJAM and their crew, with the big help of popular rappers Edo Maajka and Frenkie.

Recent
Today, hip hop is more popular than ever before. Sarajevo, Tuzla and Mostar are three cities that are the most popular ones today, when it comes to new releases and hip hop happenings and concerts. Artists like Mayer and crew's like Malter, DoggSound, REVSKL and HighTime, are currently the most popular ones in Mostar. While in Sarajevo artists like Buba Corelli and from BluntBylon and crews like Capital City Crew, Treća Smjena Crew including Sajfer and Santos, G-Recordz etc. belong in the category of the most popular and listened artists in the country.

For the first time in history of Bosnian hip hop culture, it is possible to hear and find new songs and videos on TV, which was almost unheard of back in the 2000s. Media picture of hip hop is growing with BHOP Portal being the most updated website when it comes to being the place to find everything that is currently happening in Bosnian hip hop, and currently it is the most visited internet website that specifically covers the Bosnian hip hop scene. FMJAM is the most popular crew and private 'net' label in the country, and their radio is going on strong for more than ten years with DJ Soul as the main DJ. Facebook and YouTube still remain the main tool artists use to develop their fan base, because even though hip hop has gotten more popular in Bosnia, it is still nowhere near the level other popular music styles are, when it comes to fans, media coverage and anything else of that sort.

History of Bosnian Hip Hop
In the late 1980s, a rapper emerged name "Elvir Reper", who never recorded any songs, but did actively engage in rapping and is credited as introducing hip hop material from popular American hip hop acts at that time.

Because of the war in Bosnia that started in 1992, hip hop stopped for a while, only to be revived by what has become known as the second wave of hip hop. Artists such as Alaga, Mr. Johnny (Sarajevo) Crni Zvuk, Kwonel and MC Fudo (Tuzla) emerged with numerous demo songs, played on radios, concerts, and became popular around their town of Sarajevo.

Numerous attempts and limited exposure on radio was a problem until 1999, when DJ Soul and Erol created the first Bosnian hip hop station FMJAM.

With the help of FMJAM, the first songs were produced in a studio. After numerous shows, FMJAM helps create the hip hop group Disciplinska Komisija, with the lead rapper Edo Maajka, who would lead the revival movement in Bosnian hip hop.

A little later FMJAM establishes themselves enough to be able to create a website, on which a number of demo songs were released on. With these demo songs and the organization that FMJAM provided, Bosnian hip hop for the first time had an organization to rely on to have the resources available to provide for future acts and organize concerts and hip hop gatherings for the youth.

Although FMJAM played a large role in organizing Bosnian hip hop, it is recognized by the majority of media that Edo Maajka was the artist, with his 2002 debut album, that introduced hip hop to the majority of Bosnia, thus allowing FMJAM to continue their work.

Diaspora
Although different, Bosnian hip hop has also proven itself very popular and successful throughout the United States. With the introduction of the group Slicc & Aone, in the late 1990s and early 2000s, Bosnian hip hop made its debut in the United States. The duo gained popularity quickly, which also opened up a new path to oncoming Bosnian-American hip hop artists. Other notable Bosnian hip hop artists throughout the U.S. include Rima D, Rnel, Prah, Opijum Veza, Gazije, Udarna Snaga and KoCity RimeS.

Modern Hip Hop and Auto-Tune fusions
Today, we have many artists who emerged in the last 10 years who mix Hip Hop with Pop, EDM, Folk, Trap and Ethnic sounds. Almost all of them use an Auto-Tune to create distinguished sound. Hip hop artists like Future, Playboi Carti, Travis Scott, and Lil Uzi Vert use Auto-Tune to create a signature sound. The effect has also become popular in Rap music and other genres in Balkans. The main Bosnian artists in this subgenre are Jala Brat, Buba Corelli, Sajfer, Inas, Cunami, Albino, SMA, Valderrama Flow, Medico, Mehdi, Loš Sin, Klijent, Arpino Sachi and Franco Balkan.

External links 
 BHOP Portal - BiH Hip Hop Portal (In Bosnian)
 Biggest Balkans Hip-Hop Community (In Bosnian)
 Sarajevo Hip-Hop history  (In Bosnian)
 Fmjam's website (In Bosnian)
 Edo Maajka's official website (In Bosnian)
 Hip-Hop Tuzla blog (In Bosnian)
 Old School Bihać Hip Hop

References